Nayyirah Waheed is a poet and author who has published two books of poetry and has been described as "perhaps the most famous poet on Instagram." While Waheed is a reclusive writer who doesn't reveal many details about her life, her poetry is frequently shared through social media accounts. Her poetry is known for being "short and minimalistic" and "incredibly touching", covering topics such as love, identity, race, and feminism.

Life 

Not much is known about Waheed's background and childhood, with Waheed describing herself as a "quiet poet" who doesn't share much online about her life. What is known is that Waheed began writing at the age of eleven after being assigned to write a poem for a community newspaper by her English teacher. Since then, she has published two books and gained a loyal following on Instagram where she currently has over 590,000 followers. On her Instagram account, Waheed routinely posts photos of her own work and the work of others, including fellow poet and friend, Yrsa Daley-Ward.

Influences 
Waheed says her favorite poet is Sonia Sanchez. During an interview, Waheed spoke about Sanchez saying, "What I love about Sonia is her imagery. Her weaving of words. The way she quilts. The way she sweeps words against each other. She’s just utterly divine. Through reading and engaging with her work, I learned the use of imagery and energy in words." Waheed also mentions Maya Angelou to be another poet who has influenced her work. As Waheed has been influenced by famous black female poets, she has gone on to embrace race and her own blackness through her poetry.

Poetry 
Waheed has published two books of poetry entitled salt. (2013) and Nejma (2015). After finding it difficult to first publish salt., Waheed decided to self-publish even though her work was highly criticized at the time. Since gaining a loyal following on social media, both salt. and Nejma have become highly praised and studied in schools.

In 2019, Waheed dual rereleased both works as special "expansion releases."

Waheed self-published her first book of poetry salt. in September 2013. Since then, her poems in salt. have become famous through her social media accounts on Twitter and Instagram. Her poetry in salt. revolves around the themes of love, identity, race, and feminism, and are categorized by her use of punctuation, lowercase letters, and the brevity of her words.

Since the success of salt. Waheed has published a second book of poetry entitled Nejma.

Waheed has accused poet Rupi Kaur of plagiarism, a charge Kaur denies. However, Kaur has stated she takes inspiration from Waheed.

Reception 

Waheed's collection salt. has been described as "lines filled with force and grit" and a "collection of thoughts that build to a quiet crescendo against all the forces of racism, misogyny and xenophobia." Her poetry has been praised for calling "out to care for what is most imperiled, and how words can keep us going." Jet Magazine said that her poetry will make readers want to re-evaluate their lives "as each poem breaks down your emotions and leaves you picking them up off the floor, piece by piece.

While her work was originally criticized for not following the more traditional rules of poetry, fans of Waheed's work praise her use of full stops and two to three lined poems.

References

External links 

 preFICTION, Waheed's Instagram account

21st-century African-American women writers
21st-century African-American writers
21st-century American poets
21st-century American women writers
African-American poets
American women poets
Instagram poets
Living people
Year of birth missing (living people)